The siege of Little Butte des Morts was a battle fought during the Fox Wars, in Wisconsin, and Michigan. The battle was fought at Little Lake Butte des Morts, in what is now Winnebago County, Wisconsin, in 1716. At the time, the Fox had a massive stronghold at Butte Des Mortes, with possibly thousands of inhabitants. New France, knowing that Butte Des Morts was an important stronghold during the Fox Wars, laid siege to the fort.  The French brought two pieces of cannon and a grenade mortar.  The siege lasted three days, much longer than the French had anticipated.  Butte des Morts was attacked by New France again in 1730, led by Paul Marin de la Malgue.

There has recently been some doubt about the veracity of the 1730 attack, leading to the removal of the Butte des Morts historic marker in March 2017.

Notes

Winnebago County, Wisconsin
Pre-statehood history of Wisconsin